The Wenxian Tongkao or Tongkao was one of the model works of the Tongdian compiled by Ma Duanlin in 1317, during the Yuan Dynasty.

References
Dong, Enlin, et al. (2002). Historical Literature and Cultural Studies. Wuhan: Hubei Dictionary Press. 
Xu, Guanglie, "Wenxian Tongkao" ("Comprehensive Examination of Literature"). Encyclopedia of China, 1st ed.

External links
Various editions of the Wenxian Tongkao - Chinese Text Project
Wenxian Tongkao "Comprehensive Studies in Administration" — Chinaknowledge

Chinese history texts
14th-century history books
Yuan dynasty literature
Primary sources for early Philippine history